NGC 2419 (also known as Caldwell 25) is a globular cluster in the constellation Lynx. It was discovered by William Herschel on December 31, 1788. NGC 2419 is at a distance of about 300,000 light years from the Solar System and at the same distance from the Galactic Center.

NGC 2419 bears the nickname "the Intergalactic Wanderer," which was bestowed when it was erroneously thought not to be in orbit around the Milky Way.  Its orbit takes it further away from the galactic center than the Magellanic Clouds, but it can (with qualifications) be considered as part of the Milky Way. At this great distance it takes three billion years to make one trip around the galaxy.

The cluster is dim in comparison to more famous globular clusters such as M13. Nonetheless, NGC 2419 is a 9th magnitude object and is readily viewed, in good sky conditions, with good quality telescopes as small as 102mm (four inches) in aperture. Intrinsically it is one of the brightest and most massive globular clusters of our galaxy, having an absolute magnitude of -9.42 and being 900,000 times more massive than the Sun.

It was proposed that NGC 2419 could be, as Omega Centauri, the remnant of a dwarf spheroidal galaxy disrupted and accreted by the Milky Way. However, later research seems to have disproved this theory.

Astronomer Leos Ondra has noted that NGC 2419 would be the "best and brightest" for any observers in the Andromeda Galaxy, looking for globular clusters in our galaxy since it lies outside the obscuring density of the main disk. This is analogous to the way the cluster G1 can be seen orbiting outside of the Andromeda Galaxy from Earth.

It was found to be composed of two different populations, one behind more helium-rich than the other, which does not fit the current model for globular cluster formation (which leads to a very homogeneous population in the cluster). This raises new questions on how this globular cluster was formed.

Gallery

References

External links

 SEDS – NGC 2419
 perseus.gr – NGC 2419 in a LRGB CCD image based on 2 hrs total exposure
 APOD (2009-01-23) – NGC 2419
 
 

Globular clusters
Lynx (constellation)
2419
025b
Astronomical objects discovered in 1788